Porumbeşti may refer to:

Porumbeşti, a commune in Cantemir district, Moldova
Porumbeşti, a commune in Satu Mare County, Romania

See also 
Porumbeni (disambiguation)